Rutledge may refer to:

Place names

United States
Rutledge, Alabama
Rutledge, Florida
Rutledge, Georgia
Rutledge, Minnesota
Rutledge, Missouri
Rutledge School
Rutledge, Oregon
Rutledge, Pennsylvania
Rutledge, Tennessee
Rutledge, West Virginia
Rutledge, Wisconsin
Rutledge Run

Other places
Rutledge, New South Wales

People

Given name
Rutledge Dennis
Rutledge P. Hazzard
Rutledge Pearson
Rutledge Wood, racing analyst

Surname
Ann Rutledge (1813–1835), allegedly Abraham Lincoln's first love
Archibald Rutledge
Arthur Rutledge, Sir (1843–1917), Australian politician, barrister and judge
Arthur Rutledge (1907-1997), American trade unionist
Ben Rutledge (born 1980), Canadian rower
D. W. Rutledge
David Rutledge (disambiguation), several
Dale Rutledge
Derrick Rutledge
Donald Rutledge
Earl Rutledge
Edward Rutledge (1749–1800), U.S. politician, signer of the Declaration of Independence; brother of John Rutledge
Francis Huger Rutledge
Fleming Rutledge (born 1937), American Episcopal priest, author, theologian and preacher
Guy Rutledge
Ian Rutledge
Jackson Rutledge
James Rutledge
Jason Rutledge (born 1977), New Zealand rugby union player
Jeff Rutledge
Jim Rutledge
Johnny Rutledge
Josh Rutledge (born 1989), American baseball player
Justice Rutledge (disambiguation)
John Rutledge (1739–1800), U.S. politician and Chief Justice of the United States, signer of the Constitution; brother of Edward Rutledge
Wiley Blount Rutledge (1894–1949), U.S Supreme Court justice
Justin Rutledge
Larry Rutledge
Leslie Rutledge
Leicester Rutledge (born 1952), New Zealand rugby union player
Martin Rutledge
Matt Rutledge
Patrick H. Rutledge (1830–1902), American politician and lawyer
Peter Rutledge, New Zealand chemist
Peter B. Rutledge, U.S. attorney and law professor
Philip James Rutledge
Phyllis Rutledge (1932–2015), U.S. politician
Raquel Rutledge
Richard Rutledge (1923–1985), American fashion photographer
Robert Rutledge (1948–2001), American sound editor
Rod Rutledge
Ross Rutledge
Thomas Rutledge (disambiguation)
Tom Rutledge
Wayne Rutledge
William Robert Rutledge

Fiction
"William Rutledge" (1806–1876), supposed name for the "commander" on board the non-existent Apollo 20 hoax moon shot
Rutledge, a novel by Miriam Coles Harris
Sergeant Rutledge, a 1960 American film
Inspector Ian Rutledge, a character in the mystery series of the same name by Caroline and Charles Todd

See also
Routledge, a publishing imprint
Routledge (surname)